Walter Fernández Balufo (born 14 August 1989), known simply as Walter, is a Spanish professional footballer who plays for CE Manresa mainly as an attacking midfielder.

Football career
Born in Caldes de Montbui, Barcelona, Catalonia, Walter finished his formation at FC Barcelona. He started his senior career in the lower leagues, being successively loaned to CF Sporting Mahonés and Antequera CF.

For 2009–10, Walter signed for four years with Segunda División club Gimnàstic de Tarragona, making his professional debut on 30 August 2009 by starting in a 1–0 away win against Real Murcia and finishing the season with 34 matches (21 starts). In late June 2011, however, both parties agreed to cancel his contract, and he was loaned to Hungarian side Videoton FC for two years.

Walter played his first match in top flight football on 24 July 2011, featuring the full 90 minutes in a 4–0 home success over Paksi SE. He had first appeared in the UEFA Europa League 11 days earlier, coming on as a second-half substitute in a 0–2 loss at SK Sturm Graz.

In the following years, Walter failed to settle with a team, representing K.S.C. Lokeren Oost-Vlaanderen, FC Petrolul Ploiești, Skoda Xanthi F.C. and Panthrakikos FC.

Honours
Videoton
Ligakupa: 2011–12
Szuperkupa: 2011, 2012

References

External links

1989 births
Living people
People from Vallès Oriental
Sportspeople from the Province of Barcelona
Spanish footballers
Footballers from Catalonia
Association football midfielders
Segunda División players
Segunda División B players
Tercera División players
FC Barcelona Atlètic players
CF Sporting Mahonés players
Antequera CF footballers
Gimnàstic de Tarragona footballers
CE L'Hospitalet players
Extremadura UD footballers
CE Manresa players
Nemzeti Bajnokság I players
Fehérvár FC players
Belgian Pro League players
K.S.C. Lokeren Oost-Vlaanderen players
Liga I players
FC Petrolul Ploiești players
Super League Greece players
Xanthi F.C. players
Panthrakikos F.C. players
UE Sant Julià players
Spain youth international footballers
Spanish expatriate footballers
Expatriate footballers in Hungary
Expatriate footballers in Belgium
Expatriate footballers in Romania
Expatriate footballers in Greece
Expatriate footballers in Andorra
Spanish expatriate sportspeople in Hungary
Spanish expatriate sportspeople in Belgium
Spanish expatriate sportspeople in Romania
Spanish expatriate sportspeople in Greece
Spanish expatriate sportspeople in Andorra